South African Grand Prix can refer to:

South African Grand Prix, a Formula One motor race
Individual iterations of the motorcycle Grand Prix, listed at :Category:South African Grand Prix
South African motorcycle Grand Prix
Individual iterations of the motorcycle Grand Prix, listed at :Category:South African motorcycle Grand Prix

See also 
 ISU Junior Grand Prix in South Africa